Samuel Fischer, later Samuel von Fischer (24 December 1859 – 15 October 1934), was a Hungarian-born German publisher, the founder of S. Fischer Verlag. Fischer was born in Liptau-Sankt-Nikolaus/Liptószentmiklós (now Liptovský Mikuláš), Liptau/Liptó megye, northern Hungary.

Biography 
He was trained as a bookseller in Vienna and moved to Berlin shortly afterwards. In Berlin, he joined the bookseller and publisher Hugo Steinitz. Fischer took on increasing responsibility for new publishing endeavours and managed to launch his own firm in 1886, the S. Fischer, Verlag.

The Fischer publishing house first became known by introducing the works of Ibsen to German stages and by supporting the naturalist circle in Berlin. Samuel Fischer founded the theatre society Freie Bühne with Otto Brahm to avoid censorship. 

He died in Berlin, Germany. His granddaughter was the actress Gisela Fischer.

See also 
 S. Fischer Verlag

References
Judentum-projekt.de

External links
 

1859 births
1934 deaths
People from Liptovský Mikuláš
Hungarian Jews
Austro-Hungarian emigrants to Germany
German people of Hungarian-Jewish descent
German people of Slovak-Jewish descent
19th-century German people
20th-century German people
19th-century Austrian people
20th-century Austrian people
19th-century Hungarian people
20th-century Hungarian people
19th-century publishers (people)
20th-century publishers (people)
German publishers (people)
Austrian publishers (people)
Hungarian publishers (people)
Businesspeople from Berlin
Austrian magazine founders